Piksimovo is a rural locality (a village) and the administrative center of Piksimovskoye Rural Settlement, Vashkinsky District, Vologda Oblast, Russia. The population was 152 as of 2002. There are 5 streets.

Geography 
Piksimovo is located 41 km northwest of Lipin Bor (the district's administrative centre) by road. Prokino is the nearest rural locality.

References 

Rural localities in Vashkinsky District